Selviytyjät Suomi (season 6) is the sixth season of the Finnish reality television series Selviytyjät Suomi. This season is filmed in the Dominican Republic where 16 celebrities are split into tribes and compete in challenges to survive and compete against each other to win €30,000. The season premiered on 29 August 2021 on Nelonen.

Contestants

Season Summary

Voting history

Notes

References

External links

2021 Finnish television seasons
Survivor Finland seasons